Taglio di Po is a comune (municipality) in the Province of Rovigo in the Italian region Veneto, located about  south of Venice and about  east of Rovigo, in the lower Polesine.

Taglio di Po borders the municipalities of Adria, Ariano nel Polesine, Corbola, Loreo, Porto Tolle, and Porto Viro.

Twin towns
Taglio di Po is twinned with:

  Omišalj, Croatia

References

External links 

 Official website

Cities and towns in Veneto